Ethos is a 2011 documentary film directed and written by Pete McGrain and hosted by Woody Harrelson.  The main point of the film is to encourage people to engage in ethical consumerism.

The film uses many video interview segments from other films at length, including the Zeitgeist movies and, predominantly, The Corporation.

References

External links

2011 films
2011 documentary films
Documentary films about consumerism
Films shot in Los Angeles
Documentary films about American politics
2010s American films